The Makati Central Business District (Makati CBD) is a financial and central business district in the Philippines located in the heart of Makati in Metro Manila. It is politically known as "Central Cluster" in the West District of Makati. It is different from the Makati civic center known as "Makati Poblacion" which is situated at the northeast portion of the district. It is bounded by EDSA, Gil Puyat Avenue, Arnaiz Avenue, and Chino Roces Avenue. The whole district occupies barangays of San Antonio, San Lorenzo, Bel-Air, and Urdaneta.

Many of the skyscrapers in Metro Manila are in this area. The business district is also considered one of the most vibrant commercial districts in Southeast Asia. It contains the Ayala Center, one of the region's major shopping centers.

The financial district is managed by two groups—the Makati Commercial Estates Association (MaCEA) and the Ayala Property Management Corporation (APMC).

History

Pre-war period 
Downtown Makati started out as part of the wide municipality of Santa Ana de Sapa (part of the City of Manila today) and became a town of its own in 1670, then as San Pedro de Macati in honor of its patron, Saint Peter.

In 1851, Don José Bonifacio Roxas (a member of the Ayala-Roxas family) purchased the farm estate of "Hacienda San Pedro de Macati" from the Jesuits for 52,800 pesos. The western portion of the estate is now what is called the downtown.  Since then, Makati and its development remain close to the Zobel de Ayala family.

In 1901, the Americans declared the whole area south of the Pasig River, including the whole Hacienda San Pedro de Macati (Downtown), down to Barangay Ayala Alabang, a US military reservation; thus establishing Fort McKinley, which is now known as Fort Bonifacio. That same year, the whole town, with a population of 25,000, was incorporated from the then Province of Manila to the new province of Rizal with Marcelino Magsaysay serving as the town president.

In the 1930s, the first airport in Luzon island, Nielson Field, opened in what is now the Ayala Triangle within the hacienda. The airport was officially inaugurated in 1938, and Philippine Airlines began its operations there in 1941.

The tracks of what is now the Philippine National Railways reached the town very early in the decade, which is located at the western portion of the downtown at present, with three stations serving commuters and residents.

Postwar period 
After the destruction of World War II that brought upon Makati, the town grew rapidly, and real estate values boomed. As Nielson Field closed down in 1948, the plan was set for the building of the central business district. The first centrally planned communities from the Ayalas' farm estate were established in the 1950s. Some of the gated communities (Urdaneta, San Lorenzo, San Antonio, and Bel-Air Villages) that were developed grew into commercial areas and office parks.

The multiple-lane Ayala Avenue was completed in 1958, which was once part of the runway of the first commercial airport in the country, Nielson Airport. The downtown was developed into high density residential and commercial areas according to specific zoning regulations.

In the early 1960s, Ayala Corporation commissioned some of the first high-rise buildings along Ayala Avenue from one of the country's best known architects, Leandro V. Locsin.

The Makati Stock Exchange (MkSE) was established on May 27, 1963, with its trading area located along Ayala Avenue in downtown. Although both the MSE (Manila Stock Exchange) and the MkSE traded the same stocks of the same companies, the bourses were separate stock exchanges for nearly 30 years until December 23, 1992, when both exchanges were unified to become the present-day Philippine Stock Exchange.

Downtown Makati has been the financial capital of the Philippines since the late 1960s, owing to congestion, relative lack of expansion area, higher land prices and taxes, and urban decay in Manila. The downtown district rapidly developed during the terms of town mayors Maximo Estrella, Rafael Bañola and Jose Luciano, who encouraged the massive development of the town and welcomed foreign and local investors to what was tagged  the nation's number one municipality at that time. Bañola's mayorship saw the building of the Ayala Center complex in the mid 1960s.

Martial Law era 

In 1972, President Ferdinand Marcos imposed Martial law in the Philippines. The formal announcement of the proclamation was made in the evening of September 23. Economic activity in the downtown was still ongoing, with Nemesio Yabut as town mayor, preparing the district for Makati's full integration as part of the new region of Metro Manila (officially the National Capital Region) and as a founding member of the Metropolitan Manila Commission, which it achieved with the commission's formal establishment on November 7, 1975, ending Makati's many years as a town under Rizal Province.

Following the assassination of Ninoy Aquino in 1983, the downtown area was one of the many places of rallies and mass demonstrations that were the basis of the People Power Revolution against the dictatorship of then-President Marcos in 1986. It was that decade that witnessed the emergence of a so-called moderate opposition, with the Makati Business Club, against Marcos' ailing authoritarian regime. Established in 1980, the MBC, a union of executives from business entities operating in the district, was then a voice of opposition to the dictatorship, and it was one of the leading organizers of what was then dubbed the Confetti Revolution, so-named due to the yellow confetti from torn phone directories thrown along Ayala Avenue from the buildings in the wide road, whenever the rallies would happen.

Late 1980s
After the death of Mayor Nemesio Yabut during the People Power Revolution, Corazon Aquino, Ninoy's widow and the country's first female president, appointed Jejomar Binay as the acting mayor of the town of Makati and was elected mayor in 1988. Having spent his childhood in the municipality and himself a veteran of the Confetti Revolution and of the opposition activities during the Marcos administration, his first term bore witness to the events of the coup d'état attempt in December 1989, which hit the district directly.

1990s 
The country's first skyscrapers started to rise in the business district, including the Pacific Star Building, The Peak Tower, Pacific Plaza, and the Rufino Pacific Tower.

Republic Act 7854, passed by Congress in late December 1994 and signed into law by President Fidel V. Ramos on January 2, 1995, officially established the City of Makati. On February 4, 1995, the character of the new city was ratified in a plebiscite with 91% of voters in favor of cityhood. The whole people of Makati especially the businessmen in downtown celebrated the remarkable event.

21st century
In the early 2000s, the downtown was a primary target of political rallies and terrorist attacks.

On May 17, 2000, at 5:02 p.m., Glorietta inside Ayala Center was bombed injuring 12 persons, mostly teenagers. According to local authorities, the homemade bomb was placed in front of a toilet beside a video arcade. It was said to be the precursor to the May 21, 2000 SM Megamall bombing and the December 30, 2000 Rizal Day bombings.

From August 2000 to January 2001, a wave of protests against the former president Joseph Estrada occurred in the district. The anti-Estrada protests in Makati focused on Ayala Avenue, which cuts from EDSA to Buendia (now Gil Puyat Avenue).

In 2003, The Oakwood mutiny took place in the Oakwood Premier (now Ascott Makati), within the Glorietta complex, and on 2007, the Manila Peninsula siege took place at The Peninsula Manila. Both happened at the Makati CBD to call for former president Gloria Macapagal Arroyo to step down.

The 2007 Glorietta explosion ripped through Glorietta 2 on October 19, 2007. The death toll in the explosion was 11, with 120 injured. Despite conflicting reports, it was concluded that the explosion was caused by a faulty liquefied petroleum gas tank located in a Chinese restaurant.

In 2011, the Occupy Wall Street movement protesting economic inequality and the power of United States financial institutions spread from New York City to other parts of the world, including the Philippines. The movement's supporters' first action was held on October 14, when protesters marched in Makati City from the Ninoy Aquino monument on Ayala Avenue to the American Chamber of Commerce. The movement here in the country is called "Occupy Philippines", which had other protests held at the US Embassy and Rizal Park in Manila after the protest in Makati.

On 2014, the Makati Tourism Foundation and Makati city government started a tourism campaign called "Make it Happen, Make it Makati", which promotes tourism mainly in the business district.

Divisions 
thumb|Bird's eye view of the Makati Central Business District.
The Makati Central Business District is situated within four barangays of Makati.

Barangay Bel-Air 

Barangay Bel-Air is an affluent enclave and the richest barangay in the Philippines  located in the heart of Makati Central Business District, established in the early 1950s. The barangay includes Ayala North, Buendia Area, Ayala Triangle, Salcedo Village and Bel-Air Village. The predominant land use of this tobacco pipe-shaped barangay is residential and commercial. It boasts commercial buildings and establishments.

Bel-Air Village is the third subdivision developed by Ayala. The development, which started in 1957, was undertaken in four phases. The village boundaries are clockwise, Estrella Street, EDSA, Jupiter Street, Nicanor Garcia (Reposo) Street, Kalayaan Avenue, Amapola Street, back to Estrella.

Ayala Triangle is a sub-district of Downtown Makati, comprising the land between Ayala Avenue, Makati Avenue and Paseo de Roxas. The Ayala Triangle Gardens is Makati's Central Park, which was the only urban oasis in Makati at the heart of the central business district, will be developed into mixed commercial and residential space. This triangular block also houses the Makati Stock Exchange, the Ayala Tower One and the Filipinas Heritage Library, built on the site of the historic Nielson Tower.

Salcedo Village  is a business park developed by Ayala Corporation located in Makati Central Business District. It is named after the de Salcedo brothers - Juan and Felipe - who are both Spanish conquistadors who were part of the Legazpi's expedition. It is bounded by Gil Puyat Avenue, Makati Avenue, Paseo de Roxas, and Ayala Avenue. It is home to the country's notable office skyscrapers like the PBCom Tower and GT International Tower, as well as the Salcedo Community Market at Salcedo Park.

Ayala North is an informal district bounded by the streets of Gil Puyat Avenue, Ayala Avenue Extension, Metropolitan Avenue and Nicanor Garcia Street. It is the home of Alphaland Makati Place, The Lerato, The Columns Ayala Avenue, Makati Life Medical Center, Altaire, BIR Regional Office Building, The Zone Sports Center and FEU Campus Makati.

Buendia Area got its name from the former name of Gil Puyat Avenue. The offices of Department of Trade and Industry is located at 385 Industry and Investments Building along Buendia. SM Cyberzone Buildings and other mid-rise commercial buildings is found along Gil Puyat Avenue. Buendia MRT Station serves the area. It is one of the two underground stations that can be found on the transit, the other being is the Ayala MRT Station, which is also serves the business district.

Barangay San Antonio 

Based on the 2010 census of population released by the National Statistics Office, San Antonio has a percentage share of 2.2% or 11,443 versus the city's population with a density of 13 persons per . San Antonio is bounded by Barangay La Paz in the north, Barangays Pio Del Pilar and San Lorenzo in the south, Barangays Sta. Cruz and Bel-Air in the east, and Barangay Palanan in the west. Formerly called Barrio Camachile, it is named after Saint Anthony of Padua, the barrio's patron saint.

San Antonio Village is a medium density residential village in the northern portion of the barangay. Other recognized structures located there include the San Antonio National High School, San Antonio Elementary School, National Shrine of the Sacred Heart, and St. Paul the Apostle Sanctuary. Moreover, the most notable personality residing in the village is former Vice President Jejomar Binay and his family.

San Antonio South is an informal highly density residential and commercial area in the southern portion of the barangay. It is bounded by Metropolitan Avenue, Chino Roces Avenue, Ayala Avenue Extension, Yakal and Dela Rosa Streets. It consists of high-rise residential and commercial buildings, as well as the Makati Central Police Headquarters, Makati Central Fire Station, and Makati Central Post Office.

Barangay San Lorenzo 

Barangay San Lorenzo, included under Cluster 1 or Central Cluster, is considered one of the richest barangays in the Philippines for it embraces part of the Central Business District, where its revenue mainly comes from. The population density of Barangay San Lorenzo is computed to be 6 persons per 1,000 square meters. Established in the 1950s, it is also one of the oldest.

Ayala Center is a major commercial development operated by Ayala Land located in the central business district of Makati. It is a premier shopping and cultural district in Metro Manila. The area is bounded by Ayala Avenue on the east, Epifanio de los Santos Avenue (EDSA) on the south, Arnaiz Avenue on the west, and to north by Legazpi Street and Paseo de Roxas. The Ayala MRT Station of the MRT Line 3 serves the area.
Glorietta and Greenbelt shopping malls are located within the complex. This lifestyle hub is the Philippines's shopping mecca, and is serviced by upscale hotels.

Legazpi Village is a business park built by the Ayala Corporation within the Makati downtown area. It is named after Miguel López de Legazpi, a Spanish conquistador who became the Spanish East Indies's (present-day Philippines) first Governor-General under the Spanish rule. The area is home to the Asian Institute of Management, as well as the Washington SyCip Park and Legazpi Active Park.

Pasong Tamo Area is an informal district located along Chino Roces Avenue (formerly Pasong Tamo) outside San Lorenzo Village. Don Bosco Makati, The Beacon Makati, Cityland Pasong Tamo Tower, Makati Ford, Wilcon IT Hub, San Lorenzo Place, and some warehouses are located in this area.

San Lorenzo Village is a residential village located at the south of Legazpi Village and Ayala Center. It is the home of Assumption College San Lorenzo.

Barangay Urdaneta 

It is one of the first centrally planned communities together with Forbes Park, San Lorenzo and Bel-Air which was established in the 1950s by the Ayala Family. Originally, Urdaneta and Bel-Air formed part of a single village called “Beldaneta”.
The barangay is bounded by the roads of EDSA, Ayala Avenue, Makati Avenue, and Buendia Avenue. Its bounding barangays are Bel-Air (north and west), San Lorenzo (south), and Forbes Park (east).

Roxas Triangle is a district and intersection of the major streets of Paseo de Roxas, Makati Avenue and Gil Puyat Avenue. The offices of Development Bank of the Philippines and Metropolitan Bank and Trust Company are located here. Mandarin Oriental Manila and Roxas Triangle Towers are also located in the area.

Apartment Ridge is a complex of apartment and condominium buildings along the streets of Makati Avenue and Ayala Avenue outside Urdaneta Village. The Peninsula Manila, Discovery Primea and The Makati Tuscany are located in this area.

Urdaneta Village is a quiet and peaceful residential gated community within in its barangay. The name of the barangay came from the subdivision's name.

Economy

Corporate headquarters 
Most of the famous law firms, construction firms, stock brokerages and other big companies in the Philippines have their main offices here. Palafox Associates, Sycip, Gorres, Velayo & Co. and Gozar Planners are examples of business firms headquartered in the district. Top Frontier Investment Holdings, Ayala Corporation, and Metropolitan Bank and Trust Company, which are companies listed in Forbes Global 2000, headquartered in the downtown area. Many companies listed in the PSE Composite Index headquartered in the district like Ayala Land, Banco de Oro, Bank of the Philippine Islands, DMCI Holdings, GT Capital, Metro Pacific Investments, PLDT, and Security Bank. Universal and commercial banking corporations have their main offices in the area like China Banking Corporation, Development Bank of the Philippines, Philippine Savings Bank, Rizal Commercial Banking Corporation, Security Bank, United Coconut Planters Bank, Chinatrust Philippines, HSBC Philippines, Maybank Philippines, Philippine Bank of Communications and Philippine Veterans Bank.

Makati is the second home of broadsheet newspaper publications in the Philippines, behind Manila. The Inquirer Group, who owns Philippine Daily Inquirer, the second most widely read broadsheet newspaper in the Philippines, has its headquarters in downtown. Business newspaper publications like BusinessMirror, the tabloid newspaper publications are Pinas The Filipino's Global Newspaper, have its headquarters in broadcasting networks and the two television companies are Swaga Sug Media Corporation thru Sonshine Media Network International (SMNI), Rajah Broadcasting Network and one radio companies are Radio Mindanao Network have their headquarters in the district. MediaQuest Holdings, one of the largest media conglomerates in the country, is headquartered here. The company owns most of the media establishments and two television and radio networks such as TV5 Network, Inc. (TV5) and Nation Broadcasting Corporation (NBC), a Pay TV provider Cignal TV (Cignal), and the two broadsheet BusinessWorld Publishing Corporation (BusinessWorld) and Philstar Daily, Inc. (The Philippine Star), Smart Communications, which is a wholly owned mobile phone and Internet service subsidiary of the PLDT, is headquartered in the district.

The Ayala Automotive Holdings Corporation, a subsidiary of Ayala Corporation is the largest automotive company in the country, which has its main offices in the district. The company owns the regional operations of Honda, Isuzu and Volkswagen in the Philippines.

Until March 2018, when it moved to Bonifacio Global City in Taguig, the Philippine Stock Exchange Headquarters, along with the Makati Trading Floor, was located in the CBD, and was the successor to the long running Makati Stock Exchange, which operated from 1963 to 1992.

Regional headquarters 
There are more than a hundred multinational companies, which are companies listed in Forbes Global 2000, have regional headquarters and operations in Makati, most within the CBD, like Intel, Microsoft, Nestlé, Syngenta, Shell, Convergys, PeopleSupport, SC Johnson & Son Inc, CBN Asia, Stages Production Specialist Inc, Alaska Milk Corporation, and Accenture. There are many call centers present in the area like Teletech, Convergys, PeopleSupport, and Teleperformance. Hewlett Packard Philippines and an HP Service Center are in Makati City. Asiana Airlines operates a sales office on the sixth floor of the Salcedo Tower in Makati City.

Facilities

Healthcare 
The Makati CBD is the location of the Makati Medical Center, a private hospital and the largest healthcare company in the country and a subsidiary of Metro Pacific Investments Corporation. The district also contains the Makati Life Medical Center, which is formerly the Ospital ng Makati, a public hospital operated by the Makati city government.

Education

There are several libraries in the metropolis are open to the public. The Filipinas Heritage Library is a famous iconic library situated in Ayala Triangle along Makati Avenue.

The district is also home of Makati's prestigious schools and colleges. Some top universities of the Philippines is situated in downtown. The following are:

Shopping Centers

Parks & Museums

Transportation 
Downtown Makati is the one of the most easily accessed business districts in the Philippines. Public transportation within the city is facilitated mostly using inexpensive jeepneys and buses for commuters working in the district. Most of the buses and jeepneys come from EDSA, the main thoroughfare in Metro Manila. Buses plying the avenue from the south Metro Manila and Laguna pass through the central business/financial district daily. Ayala Center is the main public transport terminal inside the district, where various jeepneys, UV Express, and buses stop. This can also accommodate the vehicles of passengers riding the MRT. There are also various point-to-point bus stops especially in Legazpi Village and at One Ayala. There are also available intercity bus in downtown that plies routes from Ayala Center to Fort Bonifacio via McKinley Road operated only by the Bonifacio Transport Corporation, called BGC Bus. In 2015, the city's new transport hub called the McKinley Exchange Corporate Center, which is also along EDSA outside downtown, was opened. People enter and leave the city through this new central transport hub, which serves buses, taxes and jeepneys and is a walking distance from the MRT Ayala station.

There are several parking buildings for car-owned people working in downtown. Taxi cabs are also available for people working in downtown. Because it is the leading business district in the metropolis, it sometimes experience traffic congestion. The Metropolitan Manila Development Authority is responsible for traffic regulation in the metropolis. In 1995, they implement road space rationing called Unified Vehicular Volume Reduction Program to reduce the traffic congestion. Makati's traffic enforcement implement the number coding to all road vehicles from 7:00 a.m. to 7:00 p.m. without window hours, except on expressways.

The downtown district is served by major roads and expressways. The following are:

It is also accessible through some train stations of the Manila Metro Rail Transit System (MRT) and Philippine National Railways (PNR). The following are:
 Dela Rosa PNR Station
 Pasay Road PNR Station
 Buendia MRT Station
 Ayala MRT Station

The Central Business District will be serviced by the future Makati Intra-city Subway, which is currently under construction. Two stations will be built at Mile Long–Amorsolo in Legazpi Village and Buendia in Barangay San Antonio.

References

External links
Makati.com.p: Makati CBD

 
Districts in Metro Manila
Makati
Central business districts in the Philippines
Economy of Metro Manila
Financial districts
Planned communities in the Philippines